Events from the year 1951 in Jordan.

Incumbents
Monarch: Abdullah I (until 20 July), Talal (starting 20 July)
Prime Minister: Samir al-Rifai (until 25 July), Tawfik Abu al-Huda (starting 25 July)

Establishments

 Foundation of Jordan Archaeological Museum in Amman.

See also

 Years in Iraq
 Years in Syria
 Years in Saudi Arabia

References

 
1950s in Jordan
Jordan
Jordan
Years of the 20th century in Jordan